C P Kukreja Architects (CPKA) is a multi-disciplinary design company, established in 1969, headquartered in New Delhi and New York.

C P Kukreja Architects was established in 1969 by architect C P Kukreja, after an education in Melbourne and Canada. C.P. Kukreja with his firm had been designing in various institutional projects, embassies, recreational, educational and housing projects etc.

At the age of 32, C.P. Kukreja designed  the Jawaharlal Nehru University, which was a winning entry in a national design competition, completed in 1970. In May 2019, C.P. Kukreja passed away at the age of 80. Kukreja was also the author of the book ‘Tropical Architecture’ which was published in 1978 by McGraw Hill Education.

In 2019, the company acquired the Indian arm of Chicago-based design firm dbHMS.

C P Kukreja Architects, along with IDOM Spain, is designing one of India’s largest convention centers in Dwarka for the G20 Summit in 2022.

In 2021, The Government of India has awarded the project of Development of Ayodhya to C.P. Kukreja, Larsen & Toubro and Canada based firm Lea Associates.

Awards
 Top 100 Global Architects in 20202 in the list of BD Online UK
 HUDCO Design Award 2020 by HRRL Township, Barmer, Rajasthan

Notable Works
 Jawaharlal Nehru Univesity (JNU), New Delhi 
 Ambadeep Towers, New Delhi
 India International Convention Centre, Dwarka
 Aerocity, Delhi
 Perto

References

Companies established in 1969